Colin Robert Reitz (born April 6, 1960) is a male English former track athlete who competed mainly in the 3000 metres steeplechase.

Career
Reitz won a bronze medal at the 1983 World Championships representing Great Britain, and a bronze medal at the 1986 Commonwealth Games representing England. He also won the 1983 AAA Championships title and competed at two Olympic Games.

Born in London, Reitz competed at the 1980 Moscow Olympics, where he was eliminated in the semifinals. He represented England in the 1,500 metres and 3,000 metres steeplechase events, at the 1982 Commonwealth Games in Brisbane, Queensland, Australia.

In 1983, he won the AAAs title, and went on to win the bronze medal in the 3000m steeplechase at the inaugural World Championships in Helsinki. At the 1984 Los Angeles Olympics he finished fifth in the final. In July 1986, he won a bronze medal at the Commonwealth Games in Edinburgh, Scotland, before finishing fourth at the European Championships in August. He set his personal best in the steeplechase with 8:12.11 on 5 September 1986 at a meet in Brussels. In the Track and Field News world merit rankings, he ranked in the top 10 three times; in 1983 (#4), 1984 (#6) and 1986 (#7). His final major competition was the 1987 World Championships, where he was eliminated in the heats.

International competitions
All results regarding 3000m steeplechase unless stated.

(#) Indicates overall position achieved in the semis (s) or heats (h).

References 

 

1960 births
Living people
English male long-distance runners
Athletes (track and field) at the 1980 Summer Olympics
Athletes (track and field) at the 1984 Summer Olympics
Olympic athletes of Great Britain
World Athletics Championships medalists
World Athletics Championships athletes for Great Britain
Athletes from London
English male steeplechase runners
Athletes (track and field) at the 1982 Commonwealth Games
Athletes (track and field) at the 1986 Commonwealth Games
Commonwealth Games medallists in athletics
Commonwealth Games bronze medallists for England
Medallists at the 1986 Commonwealth Games